The following is a list of United States court cases on cousin marriage. Currently only certain cases at the appellate level in the last sixty years are listed.

Case law

See also
Cousin marriage law in the United States by state

Notes

References

Co M
Marriage law in the United States
State law in the United States
United States case law lists
Marriage court cases in the United States